Stearn is a surname derived from the Old English Stearne, which means severe or strict. Variations include Stearns, Sterne and Stern. It may refer to the following:
Christopher Stearn (born 1980), English cricketer
Jess Stearn (1914–2002), Jewish-American journalist and author 
Thomas Stearn (1796-1862), English cricketer 
William T. Stearn (1911–2001), British botanist

See also
Stern (surname)
Stearne, given name and surname
Stearns (surname)

Surnames of Old English origin